The 1938 Donington Grand Prix was a Grand Prix motor race held on 22 October 1938 over 80 laps of the Donington Park circuit. The race was won by Tazio Nuvolari driving an Auto Union.

The race was organised by the Derby & District Motor Club and not by the Royal Automobile Club, and so is not generally accorded the title "British Grand Prix", notwithstanding that the race was run to the then-current international formula and attracted entries from the top teams, and that there were no other Grand Prix races organised that year in Great Britain.   

The race was originally scheduled for the 1st of October, with the German Mercedes-Benz and Auto Union teams arriving a few weeks early to prepare, but due to the German invasion of Czechoslovakia, war seemed imminent, so the Germans made to leave, and the French entries seemed unlikely, so the decision was made to cancel the race. With the diplomatic crisis resolved by the Munich Agreement, the race was hastily rescheduled for the 22nd of October.

Report
Nuvolari led off the start line, gradually building up a lead over the other German cars, with Müller, Brauchitsch, Seaman, Lang, Bäumer, Hasse and Kautz trailing Nuvolari for the first 3 laps or so. Then, on lap 4, Kautz crashed his Auto Union at Melbourne corner after his throttle jammed open, putting him out of the race. Villoresi, who was fastest of the non-German cars in practice, had made a poor start, but was now charging, reaching fifth place by lap 18, but would retire shortly after.

On lap 26, Nuvolari made a pitstop for new plugs, dropping him to fourth place, with Müller now leading Seaman and Lang. A few laps later, Robin Hanson's Alta had an engine failure, gushing oil all over the circuit near Hairpin Bend. Nuvolari nearly rolled his car, but recovered, while Brauchitsch spun twice, and Hasse suffered a race ending crash. Seaman also spun, losing a considerable amount of time being pushed away by marshals. The order then was Müller leading from Lang, Nuvolari, Brauchitsch and Bäumer.

With the race approaching half distance, the leaders started to make their fuel stops, first with Lang, and last to pit was Nuvolari, who also changed all four wheels. Just one lap after his pitstop, Bäumer's Mercedes approached Melbourne corner very slowly, and as he turned towards the pits, it became clear his engine was on fire, so he jumped clear as his car was engulfed. The pitstops and other incidents had left the top three as Lang leading from Müller and Nuvolari, who was charging. On lap 60 Nuvolari was past Müller and chasing down Lang. The gap dropped from 12 seconds on lap 63 to 10 seconds on lap 64, 6 seconds on lap 65, and 3 seconds on lap 66. Then finally Nuvolari was into first place on lap 67, passing Lang, likely affected by a shattered aero-screen, on the Starkey Straight. Nuvolari's lead continued to increase until the end of the race, and Seaman was able to overtake Müller for third place.

Classification

Practice/Starting Grid

Race

References

Donington Grand Prix
Donington Grand Prix
Donington Grand Prix
Don